Zora pumila is a species of prowling spider in the family Miturgidae. It is found in the USA.

References

Further reading

 
 
 
 
 
 
 
 
 

Miturgidae
Spiders described in 1850